Violeta Ivanov (born 15 September 1967) is a Moldovan politician who currently serves as Member of the Parliament of Moldova since 2009.

Born in Grinăuți-Moldova, Ivanov served as Minister of the Ecology and Natural Resources of Moldova between 2008 and 2009. Between December 2014 and December 2015, she was president of Party of Communists of the Republic of Moldova (PCRM) faction in parliament.

In December 2015, together with other 13 PCRM deputies, she announced creation of Social-Democratic Platform for Moldova. Between 2007 and 2008 served as Deputy Minister of the Ecology and Natural Resources of Moldova.

References

External links

 Violeta IVANOV at parlament.md
 Violeta IVANOV at old.parlament.md
 Biography on website of ministry of Ecology (archived)

1967 births
Government ministers of Moldova
Living people
Moldovan female MPs
Moldovan MPs 2009
Moldovan MPs 2009–2010
Moldovan MPs 2010–2014
Party of Communists of the Republic of Moldova politicians
Moldovan MPs 2014–2018
21st-century Moldovan women politicians
Women government ministers of Moldova